Reverse or reversing may refer to:

Arts and media
Reverse (Eldritch album), 2001
Reverse (2009 film), a Polish comedy-drama film
Reverse (2019 film), an Iranian crime-drama film
Reverse (Morandi album), 2005
Reverse (TV series), a 2017–2018 South Korean television series
"Reverse", a 2014 song by SomeKindaWonderful
REVERSE art gallery, in Brooklyn, NY, US
Reverse tape effects including backmasking, the recording of sound in reverse
 Reversing: Secrets of Reverse Engineering, a book by Eldad Eilam
Tegami Bachi: REVERSE, the second season of the Tegami Bachi anime series, 2010

Driving
 Reverse gear, in a motor or mechanical transmission
 Reversing (vehicle maneuver), reversing the direction of a vehicle
 Turning a vehicle through 180 degrees

Sports and games
Reverse (American football), a trick play in American football
Reverse swing, a cricket delivery
Reverse (bridge), a type of bid in contract bridge

Technology
Reverse engineering, a process of determining design from a finished product
Reverse gear, in a motor or mechanical transmission
Reversing gear of a steam locomotive
Reverse lookup, using a value to retrieve a unique key in an associative array
Reverse telephone directory
Reverse DNS lookup
Reverse tape effects including backmasking, the recording of sound in reverse
Thrust reversal, the reversing of a jet engine's thrust direction
Reversing type, a method to highlight a piece of text in printing

Other uses
 Obverse and reverse, the two faces of objects such as coins, paper money, medals and fabrics

See also
Auto-reverse
Reversal (disambiguation)
Reversion (disambiguation)
Revers, display of reverse side of jacket cuffs, etc.
Reversi, board game